Mathilde Rivière (born 18 December 1989) is a French freestyle wrestler. She is a bronze medalist at the European Wrestling Championships. She also represented France at the European Games in 2015 and in 2019. She represented France at the 2020 Summer Olympics in Tokyo, Japan.

Career 

At the 2017 European Wrestling Championships held in Novi Sad, Serbia, she won one of the bronze medals in the women's 55 kg event.

In 2019, she competed in the 57 kg event at the European Games held in Minsk, Belarus where she lost her first match against Iryna Chykhradze of Ukraine. In May 2021, she qualified at the World Olympic Qualification Tournament to compete at the 2020 Summer Olympics in Tokyo, Japan. She competed in the women's 57 kg event.

Major results

References

External links 
 

Living people
1989 births
French female sport wrestlers
European Wrestling Championships medalists
Wrestlers at the 2015 European Games
Wrestlers at the 2019 European Games
European Games competitors for France
Wrestlers at the 2020 Summer Olympics
Olympic wrestlers of France
21st-century French women